The SBS Monday comedy slot was part of the schedule of Australian state broadcaster SBS dedicated to off-beat, often offensive comedy programming, often produced by SBS itself and usually the highest rating night on SBS TV.

Prior to 2013, programs aired between 8:30 and 9:30pm Monday nights, after Top Gear and before SBS World News Australia. During the summer non-ratings period, it aired after Top Gear Australia. As of 2014, the slot is currently filled with programs of other genres, and much comedy programming is screened on SBS Two.

Programs aired
Bro'Town
Broken News
Chappelle's Show
Crank Yankers
Drawn Together
Garth Marenghi's Darkplace
Gerhard Reinke's Wanderlust
Housos
John Callahan's Quads!
John Safran vs God
John Safran's Music Jamboree
Life Support
The Mighty Boosh
Pizza World Record
Rex the Runt
Song for the Socceroos
South Park
Speaking in Tongues
Stella Street
Strangers with Candy
Stripperella
Swift and Shift Couriers
Velvet Soup

External links
SBS TV's website

Australian comedy television series
Special Broadcasting Service original programming
Television programming blocks in Australia